Battle of Brentford can refer to several battles at Brentford, United Kingdom:

 Brentford is a likely site of a battle led by Julius Caesar against the local king, Cassivellaunus, in 54 BC during the second invasion of Britain
 Battle of Brentford (1016) between the invading Danes and the English
 Battle of Brentford (1642) during the English Civil War